Millie Cecilia Khan  (29 July 1938 – 24 November 2003) was a lawn bowls competitor for New Zealand.

Personal life
Khan is of Māori descent through her mother, while her father was a Yugoslav emigrant. She married her husband Ron Khan, who is of Pakistani descent, when she was 16. Two of her daughters (Jan Khan and Marina Khan) were also New Zealand representative lawn bowlers.

Bowls career
A competitor at four Commonwealth Games; she won a silver medal in the women's singles at the 1990 Commonwealth Games. She won a bronze medal in the same event at the 1998 Commonwealth Games.

She won eight medals at the Asia Pacific Bowls Championships including four gold medals.

Khan won a total of eleven New Zealand National Bowls Championships titles; four in the singles (1989, 1990, 1992 and 2000); two in the pairs (1994 and 2000) and five in the fours (1989, 1990, 1997, 2001 and 2002) bowling for the Matamata Bowling Club.

Honours and awards
In the 1990 Queen's Birthday Honours, Khan was appointed a Member of the Order of the British Empire, for services to bowls.

In 2013, Khan was an inaugural inductee into the Bowls New Zealand Hall of Fame.

References

1938 births
2003 deaths
New Zealand female bowls players
Commonwealth Games silver medallists for New Zealand
Commonwealth Games bronze medallists for New Zealand
Bowls players at the 1986 Commonwealth Games
Bowls players at the 1990 Commonwealth Games
Bowls players at the 1994 Commonwealth Games
Bowls players at the 1998 Commonwealth Games
New Zealand Members of the Order of the British Empire
New Zealand Māori sportspeople
New Zealand people of Yugoslav descent
Commonwealth Games medallists in lawn bowls
20th-century New Zealand women
21st-century New Zealand women
Medallists at the 1990 Commonwealth Games
Medallists at the 1998 Commonwealth Games